Joe Simko is a New York City based illustrator who has contributed to Topps’ Garbage Pail Kids and Wacky Packages trading cards. Producer/Co-Director of the Garbage Pail Kids documentary film, 30 Years of Garbage. He is the illustrator/author of the book series, The Sweet Rot, and he designs artwork for bands, creating album covers, tour posters and concert shirts. His project Cereal Killers Trading Cards, 1st Series was released May 2, 2011. The Cereal Killers cards spoof breakfast cereals with popular horror films. Joe wrote and painted all 55 cards for the first and second set and launched the series through his new company, Wax Eye. Cereal Killers, 2nd Series was released through Wax Eye in June 2012.

Wax Eye's first mobile app game for the IOS platform, Cereal Boom, is based on characters from Simko's Cereal Killers card series.

Early life
Joe Simko was born in Meadowbrooke, PA, and raised in Southampton, Pennsylvania. He graduated from the School of Visual Arts in New York City in 1999 with a Bachelor of Fine Arts in Cartooning. He was the recipient of the Joe Orlando scholarship award from his graduating department that year. Among Simko’s instructors at the School of Visual Arts were Joe Orlando (VP of DC Comics and associate editor of Mad), Klaus Jansen, Sal Almendola, and Carmine Infantino.

Career
After graduating from the School of Visual Arts, Simko held a full-time position as an artist for men’s neckwear, creating design pieces for ties. In 2000 Simko was hired as a full-time, in-house storyboard artist for television commercials at GEM Studios in New York City. At this time he also did freelance jobs designing show posters for local bands. This freelance work gained some notice, and he began working for higher profile groups. In 2006, he designed all of the artwork for the large traveling rock tour, The Vans Warped Tour. In 2007, the Japanese rock festival MAGMA commissioned him to design all the artwork for their tour and oversee all the art direction as the managing artist.

Simko freelances full-time from his studio in New York City and continues production as author and illustrator of his book series The Sweet Rot. An original story showcasing a group of wildly eccentric little kids also known as "little rotters" in the make-believe town of Pollilop Drop,  The Sweet Rot is published by Schiffer Books.

Simko has created artwork for clients and organizations including Topps, Abrams Books, Reed Pop, Ride Snowboards, Sims Snowboards, Outlook Skateboards, The Gotham Girls Roller Derby League, Fangoria Magazine, New York Hardcore Tattoos, Spooky Empire's Ultimate Horror Weekend, Monster Mania, JLO Hangtag for Andy Hilfiger, and the NYC clothing boutique Live Fast.

Simko was penciller and co-creator, with actor Stephen Baldwin, of the graphic novel series Spirit Warriors, and designer of bottle artwork for Manglaze, a nail polish line.

His list of musical clients includes Metallica, The Misfits, GWAR, Less Than Jake, Trivium, Murphy's Law, Dwarves, Sonic Youth, Good Riddance, The Undead, Peelander Z, and others.

In 2006, a Simko designed shirt was used in the film Nick and Norah’s Infinite Playlist. The shirt was designed for the store Live Fast in New York City.

2011 was the launch of Wax Eye, a pop culture art based company formed by Simko and his wife June Gonzales. The company has released three trading card series to date: Cereal Killers series 1, Cereal Killers series 2, and Stupid Heroes; as well as a mobile app game Cereal Boom; and a T-shirt line based on the Cereal Killers brand.

In 2014, Simko formed the independent film production company Peel Here Productions, along with partners June Gonzales and Jeff Zapata. Under this film company, they have released the documentary film based on the Garbage Pail Kids phenomenon titled 30 Years of Garbage: The Garbage Pail Kids Story.

Artwork for rock music festivals
 MAGMA – 2007, 2008
 Vans Warped Tour – 2006
  – 2006, 2007, 2008
 Medusa Festival – 1 through 5 (2003 through 2006)

Published artwork
Garbage Pail Kids Cookbook - 2022
Madballs vs. Garbage Pail Kids comic book cover art - Dynamite Comics - Issues #1-4 - 2022
Garbage Pail Kids book series cover artist, written by R.L. Stine - 2020, 2021
Garbage Pail Kids, Wacky Packages trading cards for Topps - current ongoing
Series of Garbage Pail Kids comic books - IDW - 2014
One-off sketch cards for the 2012 Mars Attacks! Heritage trading card series - 2012
Alternative Movie Posters: Film Art from the Underground, Schiffer Books - Fall 2013  
The Sweet Rot, Book 3, (The Purple Meltdown) - Schiffer Books - Spring 2012
The Sweet Rot, Book 2, (Raiders of the Lost Art) - Schiffer Books - Fall 2011
The Sweet Rot – Schiffer Books - Spring 2010 (creator, illustrator, writer)
In Sunlight and In Shadow, 2009 (illustrator)
Revolver magazine,  2009
Roller Derby Art, Schiffer Books
Doll magazine – June 2007
Revolver –  March 2007
The Art of Modern Rock mini A-Z. Chronicle Books
Skinnie magazine – November 2006
Stephen Baldwin’s Spirit Warriors, graphic novel series, B&H Books (creator, illustrator)
Blood and Thunder magazine – Winter 2006
Spin magazine – spring 2006
Swank magazine – April 2004
The Art of Modern Rock, Chronicle Books
The Art of Electric Frankenstein, Dark Horse – February 2004

Art shows

2014
 Dave Brockie Memorial Art Show - MF Gallery (BKYLN, NY)- May 2014
 Comix Art Gallery Opening - Group show - Comix Art Gallery (Los Angeles, CA) - Feb. 2014

2013
 Neon Graveyard - Solo Exhibition – TT Underground Gallery @ Toy Tokyo (NYC) – June 2013
 MF Gallery's 10th Anniversary Art Show (BKYLN, NY)- June 2013

2012
 MF Gallery 10th Annual Halloween Art Show (BKYLN, NY)- Oct. 2011

2011
 WWA - Sweet Streets "American 80's in Japan" - (CA) Nov. 2011
 MF Gallery 9th Annual Halloween Art Show (BKYLN, NY) - Oct. 2011
 D****Y Group Art Show - MF Gallery (Brooklyn, NY) - January 2011

2010
Fangoria Magazine's Halloween Art show - G2 Gallery/Lounge (NYC) - October 2010
MF Gallery's 8th Annual Halloween Art show (Genova, Italy) - October 2010
I Need Your Skull Show - MF Gallery (Genova, Italy) - September 2010
Skateboard Group Art Show - G2 (NYC) - July 2010
The Civil War & Founding Fathers Custom Qee Show - Spaghetti Project (Fredericksburg, VA) - July 2010
The Sweet Rot Book Release – TT Underground Gallery @ Toy Tokyo (NYC) – June 2010
Zombies Attack Brooklyn - MF Gallery (Brooklyn, NY) - June 2010
I Need Your Skull Show - MF Gallery (Brooklyn, NY) - May 2010
G2 Opening – G2 Gallery Lounge (NYC) – April 2010

2009
Naughty and Nice show – Parlor Gallery (NJ) – Dec. 2009
Return of the Living Decks – Ave. A (NYC) – Oct. 2009
MF Gallery’s 7th Annual Halloween Art Show (NYC) – Oct. 2009
Spooky Empire’s Ultimate Horror Weekend – (Orlando, FL) – Oct. 2009
Closing Art Exhibition – Live Fast Underground Gallery (NYC) – Sept. 2009
Tatto Art Show – MF Gallery (Genova, Italy) – Sept. 2009
Kings of Pop – Ave. A (NYC) – August 2009
The Art of Simko -Solo Exhibition – Live Fast Underground Gallery (NYC) – Aug. 2009
The Punk Rot Art of Joe Simko - Solo Exhibition - ITM Lounge (NYC) – June 2009
Night of the Living Decks – Ave. A (NYC) – June 2009
MF Gallery Show at Asbury Lanes (NJ) – May 2009
Welcome to Our Nightmare - Don Pedro’s (Brooklyn, NY) – March 2009
Stitch Custom Vinyl Show – Showroom Gallery NYC (Hong Kong, Hawaii) – Feb. 2009

2008
Vicious Intent Poster Show – Showroom Gallery (NYC) – Sept. 2008
Halloween Art Show – ITM Lounge (NYC) – Sept. 2008
NYC Tribute Art Show – Ave. A (NYC) - Sept. 2008
Paint It! – MF Gallery (NYC) – June 2008
Sci-Fi Art Show – MF Gallery (NYC) – Jan. 2008

2007
Skateboard Art show – Ave. A (NYC) - August 2007
Creepy Carnival – MF Gallery (NYC) - August 2007
Bart Simpson Custom Vinyl Show–ShowroomGallery (NYC, Japan, China) Summer 2007
Zombies Attack! – MF Gallery (NYC)– April - 2007

2006
The Skull Show – The Back Alley Gallery (Minneapolis, MN) – May 2006
Girls, Girls, Girls – (Live Body Painting Exhibition) MF Gallery (NYC) –April 2006
Live Body Painting Exhibition – Live Fast (NYC) – March 2006
Zombie Art Show – MF Gallery (NYC) – January 2006

2005
The Throne Show – Lulubell Toy Bodega (Tuscan, AZ) – November 2005
Halloween Art Show – MF Gallery (NYC) – September 2005
Live Fast - Store opening/Mural exhibition (NYC) – Summer 2005
Graphic Noise Poster Show – Museum of Design (Atlanta, GA) – Summer 2005
Funny Club Show- Rotifugi(Chicago), Munky King(CA), Pixie Gallery(Tawain)–Spring

2004
Electric Frankenstein Poster Art – CBGB’s Gallery (NYC) – Summer 2004
The Art of Musical Maintenance – The Goodfoot (Portland, OR) – July 2004

2000
CBGB’s Gallery – (NYC) – May 2000

1999
Solo Exhibition - Gray Parrot Café – (Brooklyn, NY) – 1999
Society of Illustrators Group show (NYC) - 1999

References

Further reading
Suarez, Alex. "Dr. Chud, Famous Monster in Stitches", Rebel Ink, January 2010, page 71
Wernig, Crazy Glenn. "Parents Be Warned The Sweet Rot, Joe Simko talks 'bout his new book for Kids!!". New York Waste. June 2010. cover, page 8
Wernig, Crazy Glenn. "The Art of Joe Simko at LiveFast". New York Waste. Fall 2009. page 6.
Simko, Joe. "It's Called the Music Business", Alternative Press Magazine, May 2009. page 37.
Rio, Dale. "Derby's Image Makers", Blood and Thunder Magazine Winter 2006, page 44

External links

 List of all press and reviews for Joe Simko's Cereal Killers trading cards & Wax Eye company
Goodman, Eleanor (May 2012). UK Bizarre magazin, Poster Boy 
Goodman, Eleanor (October 2011). Breakfast Crime UK Bizarre magazine, pp. 94–96
McMahan, Elysia Imagination is Everything Skinnie magazine, July 1, 2011 pp. 44–49.
Joe Simko at MF Gallery
Patrick, Sean (June 18, 2010). "Get Your Rot On", New York Press
"Joe Simko – Sweet Rot Book Release + Art Show Event". Vinyl Pulse, June 2010
White, Guy E (April 2007). "Splatter, Oozed and Abuzed." Skinnie magazine. pages 70–71.

Living people
American artists
Year of birth missing (living people)